Blue Nun is a German wine brand launched by the company H. Sichel Söhne (Mainz) in 1923 with the 1921 vintage, and which between the 1950s and 1980s was a very popular international brand. For most of its existence, Blue Nun was a single German wine, which until the late 1990s was classified as a Liebfraumilch, but the name is now used for a whole range of wines of various origins. When it was created, the label was designed as a consumer-friendly alternative to the innumerable German wine labels with Gothic script and long, complicated names. With the creation of its UK office in 1927, Sichel targeted the export market. Beginning in the 1950s, Blue Nun was advertised as a wine that could be drunk throughout an entire meal, thereby eliminating the often intimidating problem of wine and food pairing. Blue Nun can be said to have been the first wine to have been produced and effectively marketed with an international mass market in mind.

After World War II, the brand became widely popular in the United Kingdom and the United States, selling for the same price as a second growth red Bordeaux wine. At its peak of popularity in 1984–1985, annual sales in the U.S. were 1.25 million cases, with another 750,000 cases sold in other markets.

During the 1970s in the U.S., a series of radio adverts promoting the wine were produced, featuring Stiller and Meara. Their ads were so effective, they boosted sales by 500%.

From the late 1980s, and more so in the 1990s, easy-drinking, semi-sweet German wines began to decline in popularity. Consequently, the brand's popularity declined, and the wine began to be perceived as tacky and dated. This change was reflected in the drink of choice of Alan Partridge, a fictional, over-the-hill British television and radio presenter. However, sales increased after Blue Nun was purchased by the Mosel-based German family firm Langguth, which bought the previous owners Sichel in 1996. They repositioned the brand, reclassifying it from a Liebfraumilch to a regular Qualitätswein bestimmter Anbaugebiete (QbA), changing the grapes from Müller-Thurgau to 30% Riesling, and making it less sweet. It remains relatively low in alcohol at 9.5%.

Brand extension
From 2001 on, Langguth also embarked on a brand extension, and has introduced several other wines under the Blue Nun name, including a German Riesling ice wine, a Languedoc Merlot and a Spanish rosé. Sales in 2004 rose by 11% in the UK, but from a low base.

In 2009, Blue Nun launched Blue Nun Gold, a sparkling wine that contained flakes of 22-carat gold. It was hoped the drink would appeal to young women drinkers and would help position the brand differently.

References to Blue Nun in popular culture and media

In music
Afro Celt Sound System, in their song "Rise Above It" from the album Seed, refer to dancing at gigs with Blue Nun. According to the lyrics of the song, heartburn going cheap is the reward for dancing at gigs with a Blue Nun.

The Beastie Boys album Check Your Head includes a musical interlude titled "The Blue Nun", in which a narrator describes a party held in the comfortable study in Peter Sichel's New York townhouse, in which the guests compliment the wine. Peter Sichel was chairman of the Blue Nun company until it was sold in 1995.

On The Beatles song "Long, Long, Long" off the White Album, rattling noises by a Blue Nun wine bottle are heard as a result of a bottle's resting on top of a Leslie speaker, which began to vibrate when Paul McCartney played a certain note on the Hammond organ. It is accompanied by a Ringo Starr drum roll.

Steve Jones, guitarist of the Sex Pistols stated in his autobiography Lonely Boy that he drank at least two whole bottles of Blue Nun before the Thames television interview with host Bill Grundy dated 1 December 1976.

In print
In the comic strip Achewood, two cats, Roast Beef and Ray, get drunk on Blue Nun during a road trip, describing it as "the wine so bad it made the news."

In issue #6 of Deadpool Corps, Lady Deadpool warns Brank, talent scout for the Blue Buccaneer/Champion, "If your spaceship is all shag carpeting and Barry White and Blue Nun on ice, you're in big trouble. I'm not looking for that kind of evening."

In Jonathan Coe's The Rotters' Club, set in Birmingham in the 1970s, Colin Trotter buys two bottles of Blue Nun to accompany dinner with the Chases, who arrive at the Trotters' with an identical bottle of wine.

In television
Heston Blumenthal experimented with carbonating Blue Nun using a Sodastream machine in one episode of his novelty cuisine series Heston's Feasts. The programme showed interviews which gave the impression that people either preferred the carbonated wine to genuine champagne or could not tell the difference.

On the BBC television series Life on Mars (series two, episode four) Blue Nun is mentioned as the wine that will be served at a party hosted by a wife-swapping couple of which the sleazy husband is a murder suspect.

In the television series Phoenix Nights (series 1, episode 4), Brian Potter offers his love interest some Blue Nun.

In the television series So What Now?, Lee Evans mentions that he will bring a bottle of Blue Nun to gain access to a party.

In the television series Gimme A Break! (season 1, episode 7) episode "Your Prisoner Is Dead", the chief (Dolph Sweet), after previously shooting an armed convenience store robber in self-defense, takes in a session with a young novice priest (Jay Johnson) in the attempt of trying to find solace for his actions where at the end the priest offers him some Blue Nun, then quips afterward "We can get Mother Teresa out of the fridge."

Blue Nun is comedy character Alan Partridge's wine of choice. Andrew Neil, the host of the satirical current affairs program This Week, makes frequent references to Blue Nun, as one of a number of running jokes in the series.

In the Father Ted episode "Grant Unto Him Eternal Rest", a promiscuous nun is described as "Sister Imelda, the Blue Nun," punning on blue movie or blue comedy.

Jeremy Clarkson offered samples of Blue Nun to Germans on his mini series Jeremy Clarkson: Meets the Neighbours (series 1, episode 3.) Clarkson pressed them, demanded answers as to why Germany would produce this terrible wine only for export, and subject the rest of the world to it. All but one of the people interviewed were repulsed by the taste.

In the television series Still Game, episode "Lights Out", the character Jack Jarvis, played by Ford Kiernan, asks the barman Boabby to serve a Blue Nun to Isa Drennan. played by Jane McCarry.

In film
Blue Nun is mentioned in the movie While You Were Sleeping when a character asks his father if he "give that bottle of Blue Nun you got" to his probation officer.

See also
 German wine
 Wine label

References

Further reading
 Jancis Robinson, (Ed.) The Oxford Companion to Wine. Oxford: Oxford University Press, second edition, 1999.

External links
 Official website 

German brands
German wine
Wine brands
Products introduced in 1923